Manciano is a village in the Italian province of Perugia in east central Umbria on a flank of Mt. Matigge, at altitude 509 m above sea-level. It is a frazione of the comune of Trevi, which is 3 km  SSW. Its population is approximately 100 inhabitants.

Geography
The frazione extends several kilometers further to the NE into the Apennine range and the hamlet of Ponze at 904 m altitude, with one more medieval church and a good view of central Umbria.

Main sights
The main point of interest of the village is the church of S. Martino and, not far away, the ruins of the Romanesque abbey church of Santo Stefano in Manciano.

References

External links
Pro Trevi
Bill Thayer's site

Frazioni of the Province of Perugia